Víctor Bravo may refer to:
Víctor Bravo Ahuja (1918–1990), Mexican politician and first Rector of ITESM
Víctor Bravo (footballer) (born 1983), Spanish footballer